The Fordyce House is a historic house at 2115 South Broadway in Little Rock, Arkansas.  Built in 1904 to a design by noted Arkansas architect Charles L. Thompson, it is believed to be the state's only example of Egyptian Revival residential design.  It is two stories in height, with narrow clapboard trim.  A recessed porch shelters the main entrance, with the stairs leading up to flanked at the top by two heavy Egyptian columns.  The second floor windows are banded in groups of three and the roof has a deep cornice with curved brackets.  John Fordyce, for whom it was built, was a prominent businessman and engineer who held numerous patents related to cotton-processing machinery.

The house was added to the National Register of Historic Places in 1975.

See also
National Register of Historic Places listings in Little Rock, Arkansas

References

Houses on the National Register of Historic Places in Arkansas
Houses completed in 1904
Houses in Little Rock, Arkansas
National Register of Historic Places in Little Rock, Arkansas
Individually listed contributing properties to historic districts on the National Register in Arkansas
1904 establishments in Arkansas
Egyptian Revival architecture in Arkansas